Buller District is one of 53 districts of New Zealand, and is within the West Coast Region. It covers Westport, Karamea, Reefton and Inangahua Junction.

The district is administered by the Buller District Council with the seat in Westport, in which 45% of the district's population live.

History 
It is understood by the carbon dating of Umu (ovens) that the Maori people settled in this region some 700 years ago.

The district takes its name from the Buller River, itself named for Charles Buller, a Member of Parliament in the United Kingdom of Great Britain and Ireland (UK) and director of the New Zealand Company, a UK-based company established in the early 19th century with a royal charter supporting colonisation efforts of New Zealand.

During the period 1853 to 1876, the current area of Buller District was administered as part of Nelson Province. With the Abolition of Provinces Act 1876, much of the current area of Buller District was administered in the newly created (January 1877) bodies of Buller County and Inangahua County. 

The Buller District was formed under the 1989 local government reforms through the amalgamation of Buller County, Inangahua County and the Westport Borough Councils.

Population

Buller District had a population of 9,591 at the 2018 New Zealand census, a decrease of 882 people (−8.4%) since the 2013 census, and a decrease of 111 people (−1.1%) since the 2006 census. There were 4,398 households. There were 4,920 males and 4,674 females, giving a sex ratio of 1.05 males per female. The median age was 49.6 years (compared with 37.4 years nationally), with 1,587 people (16.5%) aged under 15 years, 1,230 (12.8%) aged 15 to 29, 4,551 (47.5%) aged 30 to 64, and 2,223 (23.2%) aged 65 or older.

Ethnicities were 91.8% European/Pākehā, 11.2% Māori, 1.4% Pacific peoples, 2.4% Asian, and 2.3% other ethnicities. People may identify with more than one ethnicity.

The percentage of people born overseas was 10.7, compared with 27.1% nationally.

Although some people objected to giving their religion, 57.0% had no religion, 31.1% were Christian, 0.5% were Hindu, 0.1% were Muslim, 0.2% were Buddhist and 1.8% had other religions.

Of those at least 15 years old, 750 (9.4%) people had a bachelor or higher degree, and 2,400 (30.0%) people had no formal qualifications. The median income was $22,900, compared with $31,800 nationally. 783 people (9.8%) earned over $70,000 compared to 17.2% nationally. The employment status of those at least 15 was that 3,231 (40.4%) people were employed full-time, 1,284 (16.0%) were part-time, and 300 (3.7%) were unemployed.

References

External links

 Buller District Council